

Friedrich Fangohr (12 August 1899 – 17 April 1956) was a general in the Wehrmacht of Nazi Germany during World War II who commanded the I Army Corps. He was also a recipient of the Knight's Cross of the Iron Cross.

Awards and decorations
 Iron Cross (1914)  2nd Class (24 December 1917) & 1st Class (25 October 1918)
 Silesian Eagle  2nd Class (2 July 1919) & 1st Class (23 July 1919)
 Clasp to the Iron Cross (1939)  2nd Class (25 September 1939) & 1st Class (12 October 1939)

 Eastern Front Medal (22 August 1942)
 Knight's Cross of the Iron Cross on 9 June 1944 as Generalleutnant and Chief of Generalstab of Panzer-A.O.K. 4

References

Citations

Bibliography

 
 

1899 births
1956 deaths
Military personnel from Hanover
German Army generals of World War II
Generals of Infantry (Wehrmacht)
German Army personnel of World War I
Recipients of the clasp to the Iron Cross, 1st class
Recipients of the Gold German Cross
Recipients of the Knight's Cross of the Iron Cross
German prisoners of war in World War II
People from the Province of Hanover
Reichswehr personnel
20th-century Freikorps personnel